Santa Fe High School is a high school in Santa Fe, Texas in the Houston metropolitan area. It is part of the Santa Fe Independent School District. In addition to Santa Fe, its district serves parts of League City, La Marque, Hitchcock, and Dickinson.

In 2018, the school became the scene of the third deadliest high school shooting in United States history when a 17 year old junior of the school killed 10 people - 8 students and 2 teachers- before being taken into custody.

History

Santa Fe Independent School District v. Doe 
The high school football team's practice of praying during school-sanctioned sporting events was involved in the court case Santa Fe Independent School District v. Doe.

Mass shooting and aftermath 

On May 18, 2018, seventeen-year-old student Dimitrios Pagourtzis allegedly opened fire on faculty and staff, killing eight students and two teachers, as well as injuring thirteen others.

As a result of the mass shooting, the district plans to renovate the northwest area of the campus, including sealing off the art rooms in which the shooting occurred as well as the adjacent hallway. A new hallway and counselor's office will be installed. The art classrooms and art teacher offices were to be relocated.

In July 2018, the district decided to install a bulletproof security area at the main entrance, which included adding metal detectors, as well as adding panic buttons, locks, and alarm systems in classrooms. The district chose not to install a security fence.

From the 2017–2018 to the 2018–2019 school years, the enrollment of the high school declined by 100, which was attributed to both the shooting and Hurricane Harvey.

Demographics 
, the school had about 1,500 students, with the majority being Hispanic and non-Hispanic white and with 24% being classified as low income.

References

External links 

Santa Fe High School (old site)
Santa Fe Indians at Max Preps

High schools in Galveston County, Texas
Santa Fe, Texas